Claire Ozanne is an insect ecologist in the UK, she is Professor of Ecology and Vice-Chancellor & Rector of Liverpool Hope University.

Education and career 
Ozanne was educated at the University of Oxford where she did a BA and then a DPhil in Agriculture and Forest Sciences graduating in 1991.

She was Head of Biological & Health Sciences and also Assistant Dean (Learning & Teaching) and from 2010 to 2020 was Vice Provost (Academic Partnerships and International) at the University of Roehampton.

Between 2017 and 2019 Ozanne was Principal of Heythrop College, University of London, she was appointed to oversee the college's 'orderly closure.

In September 2020 she moved to SOAS as Deputy Director and Provost.  In 2023 Ozanne became Vice-Chancellor & Rector of Liverpool Hope University.

Research 
Ozanne's research looks at insects in habitats affected by human activities, in particular in temperate and tropical forests.  She has surveyed insects all around the world, including in Ethiopia which she talked about to Brett Westwood on the BBC Radio 4's Saving Species programme.

She helped found the Global Canopy Programme and has written several book chapters on insects on forests:

 Chapter 4 Sampling methods for forest understory vegetation, & Chapter 7 Techniques and methods for sampling canopy vegetation, in Insect sampling in forest ecosystems, edited by Simon R Leather, published by Blackwell in 2005.
 Chapter 14 Collecting arthropods and arthropod remains for primate studies, in Field and Laboratory Methods in Primatology: A Practical Guide, edited by Joanna M. Setchell & Deborah J. Curtis, published by Cambridge University Press in 2012.
 Chapter 10 Canopies and climate change, in Treetops at Risk: Challenges of Global Canopy Ecology and Conservation, edited by Margaret Lowman, Soubadra Devy & T. Ganesh, published by Springer in 2013.

Awards and honours 
Ozanne is a principal fellow of the Higher Education Academy.

References

External links 

 SOAS profile

Living people
Year of birth missing (living people)
British ecologists
British entomologists
21st-century British scientists
21st-century British women scientists
Women entomologists
Women ecologists
Alumni of the University of Oxford
Academics of the University of Roehampton
Academics of Liverpool Hope University